El Enemy de los Guasíbiri is the first compilation album by Tego Calderón. The album is considered to be an important factor to reggaeton's mainstream exposure in 2004 alongside Daddy Yankee's Barrio Fino and Ivy Queen's Diva.<ref>Carney Smith, Jessie. [https://books.google.com/books?id=10rEGSIItjgC&q=Ivy+Queen+Diva%27%27Encyclopedia&pg=PA1199 of African American Popular Culture]. ABC-CLIO, 2010, p. 1199.</ref> The title of the album is taken from a line in his 2003 song “Pa' que retozen.”

Track listing
 Intro
 Elegante de Boutique (Boricuas NY) 
 Gatas Gozan (Sopranos: First Season)
 Cosa Buena (Planet Reggae)
 Mi Entierro (La Mision 2)
 Cerca de Mi Neighborhood (Boricuas NY 2) 
 Guasa Guasa (feat. Voltio) 
 Al Natural (feat. Yandel) 
 Interlude 
 Naki Naki (Kilates: Rompiendo El Silencio)
 We Got the Crown "Envidia" (feat. Aventura) 
 Sopa de Letras (Babilonia)
 En Peligro de Extinción (feat. Eddie Dee) A
 Baílalo Como Tú Quieras (Los Matadores Del Genero)
 Dame Un Chance (The Majestic)
 No Paso El Cerdo (La Mision 3: A Otro Nivel)
 No Sufras Por Ella (feat. Toño Rosario)

A. This track originally appeared on Eddie Dee's El Terrorista De La Lírica (2000) album.The majority of these songs were released on compilation albums before Tego's record deal with Sony BMG cited in parentheses.''

Charts

References

Tego Calderón albums
2004 compilation albums
Albums produced by Luny Tunes
Albums produced by Noriega